Du Hengyan (born July 1951) is a retired general (shangjiang) in the Chinese People's Liberation Army. He served as Deputy Director of the Political Work Department of the Central Military Commission.

Biography
Du joined the PLA as a serviceman in 1969, and joined the Communist Party of China a year later. Wei served in the Shenyang Military Region, then the Beijing Military Region. In 1996 he became the deputy political commissar of the 28th Group Army.  In 1998 he was awarded the rank of major general. In 2000 he became political commissar of the 65th Group Army. In 2005 he became head of discipline and deputy political commissar of the Jinan Military Region. In 2007 he was promoted to lieutenant general. In 2010 he became political commissar of the Jinan Military Region. He attained the rank of General in July 2012, also he was made Deputy Director of the Political Work Department in the same year. He was a member of the 17th Central Commission for Discipline Inspection and a member of the 18th Central Committee of the Communist Party of China.

References

1951 births
Living people
Politicians from Yantai
National University of Defense Technology alumni
PLA National Defence University alumni
Central Party School of the Chinese Communist Party alumni
People's Liberation Army generals from Shandong
Chinese Communist Party politicians from Shandong
People's Republic of China politicians from Shandong